Krupnik is an East European honey liqueur.

Krupnik may also refer to:

 Kishka (food), East European sausage regionally known as krupnik or krupniok
 Krupnik (soup), Polish barley soup
 Krupnik, Blagoevgrad Province, village in Bulgaria
 Anastasia Krupnik, the protagonist from the children's book series by Lois Lowry
 Leo Krupnik (born 1979), American-Israeli soccer player and coach

See also 
 Anastasia Krupnik, children's book by Lois Lowry
 Krupenik, Russian casserole of groats and cheese